The Cheesden Valley is a valley in the Heywood area of Greater Manchester, England. It runs on a north–south alignment between Bury and Rochdale in the Metropolitan Borough of Rochdale. Cheesden Brook runs through the valley, joining with Naden Brook to eventually run into the River Roch near Heywood.  During the industrial age the valley became a centre of cotton production dependent on running water. The valley is now a conservation area.

Pre-industrial history
There are signs of human activity in Heywood dating from about 8000 BC.  Flints from the Mesolithic period have been found in Heywood, in the Cheesden Valley and Knowl Moor areas.  All were discovered on high ground close to a water source, and all are quite small and suitable for use as arrowheads and similar objects.

According to a report on an archaeological survey of the Metropolitan Borough of Rochdale (which appeared in the Greater Manchester Archaeological Journal in 1985) it is likely that the flints were not left by early residents of Heywood, but rather by bands of hunters.

In later times, the people who farmed the inhospitable countryside made a living by weaving - mostly wool from their own sheep - using a handloom, and the early mills were designed to help them with the supply of yarn and the provision of ancillary services.

Mining
As early as 1580, Queen Elizabeth I granted one John Blackwall the right to mine coal in the Cheesden Valley. In addition, it is believed that during the 17th century small communities – ‘Folds’ – could have had their own mines.

Mills
Of the many mills in Lancashire the first mill in the valley was probably erected at Kershaw Bridge in 1780 by Thomas Allanson.  It was a fustian mill and may have used Arkwright water frames.

John Haworth's Four-Acre Mill was high on the moors above Cheesden and was powered by a  waterwheel.  Haworth, who diverted the waters of a tributary stream to turn his wheel, later built a huge lodge to provide a consistent head of water for himself and other millowners - until then, they had been at the whim of the weather, laying off workers during dry spells and calling them in at all hours when the valley flooded.

A John Kay (not to be confused with the John Kay who invented the flying shuttle) built Cheesden Valley's Lumb Mill in 1786, as a fulling mill, turning woollens into felted materials.

Cheesden Brook provided power for at least 15 mills and employment for 2,000 people.  Communities grew up in what had once been a desolate region.

These moorland mills held their own for more than half a century against their big-town rivals, many finding a niche for themselves, as mainline competition increased, by developing as cotton-waste spinners.  This involved recycling the inner core of yarn cops, which had been stiffened in manufacture by the application of starch paste to avoid the need for separate wooden bobbins.  During the cotton famine caused by the American Civil War these waste mills actually experienced a boom.

By the 1870s the mills were struggling to compete against the steam-powered economics of their massive rivals in the nearby towns and, before the turn of the century, they had all but vanished.  Many of the former mills, lodges and a solitary chimney, along with other industrial workings such as Weirs and Dykes, are still evident today.

List of mills
Four Acre
Cheesden Pasture (app. b. 1810)
Lower Pasture
Cheesden Bar
Cheesden Lumb Upper
Cheesden Lumb Lower
Longlands
Croston Close Upper
Croston Close Lower
Deeply Hill
Deeply Vale
Washwheel
Bircle Dene
Kershaw Bridge

References

External links
Google Earth file - location of mills
History of Cheesden Valley
The Lost Mills of Cheesden Valley

Mountains and hills of Greater Manchester
Industrial history of the United Kingdom
Heywood, Greater Manchester